Juan José Rithner (1889 – c.1950) was an Argentine footballer, who played as goalkeeper for Club Atlético Porteño and the Argentina national team.

Rithner had a long tenure on Porteño, with 200 matches played for the club during his 13 years there. He was also one of the first scoring goalkeepers in Argentine football, having scored a total of 11 during his career. With Porteño, Rithner won four titles, two Primera División championships and two national cups.

Career 
Rithner was born in Baradero, a town in Buenos Aires Province, son of a family of Irish roots. His career as a footballer in Primera División started in C.A. Porteño. He played the championship playoff game against Alumni in 1911, which Porteño lost 2–1. And in the following year he was champion with Porteño.

His great performances in Porteño, earned him a place in the Argentina national team. On May 27, 1914, Rithner scored two goals against Uruguay, the match was played in Córdoba, Argentina. He played in the first America's Cup, held in 1916.

After his retirement from football, in 1919 Rithner served as referee in a Copa Premier Honor Argentino match held in Gimnasia y Esgrima Stadium. Argentina thrashed Uruguay 6–1, before a huge attendance of 18,000.

Titles 
Porteño
 Primera División (2): 1912, 1914  
 Copa de Competencia Jockey Club (2): 1915, 1918

References 

Argentine footballers
Footballers from Buenos Aires
Argentina international footballers
Argentine people of Irish descent
Association football goalkeepers
Río de la Plata